Kanbalu may refer to:

Kanbalu, a town in Burma
Khanbaliq, an old term for Beijing, written by Marco Polo in his Travels as Cambalu, translated by William Marsden as Kanbalu